The Japanese Pagoda is a stone statue in West Potomac Park, Washington, D.C. It is located next to the Tidal Basin, and the Franklin Delano Roosevelt Memorial.

The statue was a gift by the mayor of Yokohama, Japan in 1957. It was dedicated on April 18, 1958.

See also
 Japanese Lantern (Washington, D.C.)
 List of public art in Washington, D.C., Ward 2

References

External links
 

17th-century sculptures
Granite sculptures in Washington, D.C.
Japanese-American culture in Washington, D.C.
Outdoor sculptures in Washington, D.C.